Abu'l-Qāsim Halat (1919–1992) known as Abu'l-Aynak was a Persian Poet and satirist.

Biography 
Halat was born in Tehran on January 1, 1919. After elementary and secondary education, he was employed in the National Iranian Oil Company until retirement.

He learned Arabic, English and French when he was young. he was inclined to poesy since 1935 and started with Persian classic Poesy and biographing. his book "Divan-e Halat", including Qasidas, Ghazals, Ruba'is, Masnavis etc., shows how literary he was.
he started writing for the satiric magazine,"Tofigh" in 1938 and published his proses with the pen name "Hod-Hod Mirza"and his Poems with pen names such as: "Khoroos Larey", "Shookh", "Fazel Mab" and "Abu'l-Aynak".

Starting in 1944, weekly, he publishedpoems, which were translations of Imam Ali(Alī ibn Abī Ṭālib)'s quotes, in "Ayin-e Islam Magazine".
He was a songwriter as well, specially satiric songs which criticized social and political problems. He also worked with "Omid Magazine", "Tehran Mosavar Magazine" and "Payam-e Irani Magazine".
He was talented in Iranian traditional music, he composed the first national song of Iran and after the Iranian Revolution, in spite of oldness, he worked with "Gol Agha Magazine" for quite long.

He died October 25, 1992, due to a heart attack.

1919 births
1992 deaths
20th-century Iranian poets
Iranian satirists
People from Tehran
20th-century poets